The 2019 Scottish Women's Premier League Cup was the 18th edition of the Scottish Women's Premier League's league cup competition, which began in 2002. It was sponsored by the Scottish Building Society and officially known as the Scottish Building Society Scottish Women's Premier League Cup. The competition was contested by all 16 teams of the two divisions of the Scottish Women's Premier League (SWPL 1 and SWPL 2).

Results
All results listed are published by Scottish Women's Football (SWF).

First round
The draw for the First round took place on Saturday, 19 January 2019 at Hampden Park. All 8 ties were played on Sunday, 24 February 2019.

Quarter-finals
The draw for the quarter-finals took place on Wednesday, 27 February 2019 at Hampden Park. All 4 ties were played on Sunday, 24 March 2019.

Semi-finals

Final

Top goalscorers

Bold text indicates players and teams who are still active in the competition.

References

External links
SWPL Cup at Soccerway

Scottish Women's Premier League Cup
Premier League Cup